La mujer dorada ("The Golden Woman") is a name of an old Mexican telenovela (soap opera). It was made in 1960. Each episode is 30 minutes long.

Cast 
 Amparo Rivelles — Elvira
 Enrique Rambal — Máximo
 Rita Macedo — Hilda
 Guillermo Murray — Félix
 Andrea López — Patricia
 Enrique Álvarez Félix — Alfonso
 Enrique Lizalde — Lucio
 Emilia Carranza — Pantera
 Manolo García — Borrego
 José Antonio Cossío — Faquir

References

External links 

Mexican telenovelas
1960 telenovelas
Televisa telenovelas
Television shows set in Mexico City
1960 Mexican television series debuts
1960 Mexican television series endings
Spanish-language telenovelas